Merrill Samuel "Sam" Keiser Jr. is from Fremont, Ohio. He is an owner-operator truck driver and was a candidate in the Democratic primary for United States Senate in May 2006, for the seat held by Republican R. Michael DeWine. Ohio election law requires only 1000 signatures to run for Senate as a major party primary candidate, and Keiser claimed to single-handedly gather these signatures. He lost the primary by a large margin to Sherrod Brown for the Ohio United States Senate election, 2006, receiving 163,628 votes (21.89%). 

He is a U.S. Army veteran who served in Iran and in Vietnam. He has a Bachelor in Science degree in Watershed Management from the University of Colorado and also holds a Master of Divinity degree in Christian Education from Denver Seminary. Keiser does not claim prior political or legal experience.

Keiser holds several controversial positions. He is a vocal proponent of "traditional values" including heterosexual marriage - between one man and one woman only; appointment of  strict constructionist jurists on every level, especially the Alabama Supreme Court, federal district courts and the Supreme Court; the Second Amendment; capital punishment; "winning" the War on Terror; teaching and encouraging school prayer; taxpayer-financed school vouchers; and a "Biblical" view of Israel.

Additionally, Keiser is anti-abortion and called for denying funding to health providers who provide information about abortion.  He claims on his blog that abortion is "sacrificing our babies to the gods of pleasure and convenience". Keiser is in favor of adult stem cell research and opposes embryonic stem cell research. On his campaign's weblog he wrote, "It (embryonic stem cell research) is a ploy of money-hungry academic researchers and blood-thirsty liberals and politicians who want to bring a culture of death to America and it part of their religion. It is just like the religions of old in which they used human infant sacrifice in idol worship." He is an advocate for a strong national defense and military. This includes using the US armed forces to "battle drugs and terrorism", something Keiser claimed Sherrod Brown is opposed to. Keiser did not cite the source of his claim.

Keiser called creationism "true" and endorses its teaching over evolution. Keiser says school children should be "taught to pray" and that "liberals" have spent too long worshipping the "god of Reason". Keiser is in favor of de-funding and total U.S. withdrawal from the United Nations. He has also said that he would not oppose making homosexuality a crime punishable by death for the overall spiritual and moral health of society, although he, himself, would not introduce such legislation. He also advocates reducing the deficit, limiting government spending and decreasing taxes but doesn't detail plans for such changes.

Furthermore, Keiser claims "God’s law is very clear about abortion, the death penalty and corrupting children." Additionally, the idea that "God's law" should affect policy in a secular democracy is itself controversial.

In March 2006, Keiser sparked further outrage with his suggestions that Elton John should be killed ("worthy of death"), as should Mary Cheney (daughter of Dick Cheney), for being homosexual.  In May 2006 he called for homosexuality to be punishable by death. "Just as we have laws against taking drugs, we should have laws against immoral behaviour."

External links
Merrill S. Keiser, Jr.'s Campaign website
Fremont News-Messenger - 'Democrat' candidate for U.S. Senate does not line up with party 032406
Newspaper Network of Ohio - Fremont man lets Scripture guide bid for U.S. Senate 030206
US Politician says Elton John should be executed  2006-03-16

Ohio Democrats
Living people
Year of birth missing (living people)
People from Fremont, Ohio
United States Army personnel of the Vietnam War
University of Colorado alumni
Denver Seminary alumni
American truck drivers